The Supreme Court of Japan is the highest court in Japan, composed of fifteen justices. The Chief Justice is nominated by the Cabinet and appointed to office by the Emperor, while associate justices are appointed by the Cabinet in attestation of the Emperor. The Judiciary Act fixes the total number of justices at 15, but allows the Court itself to specify how many justices sit on a petty bench. By law, at least ten out of the fifteen justices must have either ten years of combined experience as judges, or twenty years of combined experience as judges, lawyers, or professors.

Japan's bar associations are careful to select lawyers whose terms will be shorter than those of nominated former judges. (Potential justices are often 64 years old or above.) This causes quick turnover of justices, which has resulted in a perception of the Court as a "nameless, faceless judiciary."

After appointment, Supreme Court justices are subject to a "people's review": an automatic retention referendum in which the voters may remove the judge from office. A people's review occurs at the first election to the House of Representatives after a justice assumes office, when the question of whether his tenure should continue is put to voters on the ballot. The Supreme Court justice is then subject to a further people's review at the first lower house election after every ten years. , no Supreme Court justice has ever been dismissed by a people's review.

Justices
This is a list of all  current and former justices of the modern Supreme Court of Japan.

References

Supreme Court of Japan
Japan